Karjat Jamkhed Assembly constituency is one of the 288 Vidhan Sabha (legislative assembly) constituencies of Maharashtra state, western India. This constituency is located in Ahmednagar district.

Geographical scope
The constituency comprises Karjat taluka and Jamkhed taluka.

Members of Legislative Assembly

References

Assembly constituencies of Maharashtra
Ahmednagar district